Katy Gutiérrez Muñoz  (born in Bilbao, 1952) is a Spanish politician from the Basque region and a member of the Basque Parliament from 30 November 1994 to 1 September 1998 as a member of the Izquierda Unida/Ezker Batua (IU-EB) coalition party. She served as a member of the Commission on Education and Culture from 1995 to 1998 and a member of the Parliamentary Control Committee from 1995 to 1997.

References 

1952 births
20th-century Spanish politicians
20th-century Spanish women politicians
Basque women in politics
Living people
Members of the 5th Basque Parliament
Politicians from Bilbao
University of the Basque Country alumni
United Left (Spain) politicians
Euskadiko Ezkerra politicians
University of Deusto alumni
Basque academics
Women members of the Basque Parliament